McHenry is a station on Metra's Union Pacific Northwest Line, located in McHenry, Illinois. The station is the terminus of the McHenry Branch of the Northwest Line; inbound trains operate as far as Ogilvie Transportation Center in Chicago. Proposals exist to expand service on the line by adding stations in Prairie Grove and Johnsburg. Most Northwest Line trains operate along the Harvard branch to Harvard or  rather than the McHenry Branch. The station only has one track and one platform due to the low number of trains that serve the station. Two storage tracks are used to store two trains during overnight hours as well as weekends and holidays. The station is located at grade level. There is one grade crossing of a road at the station, which is placed under a Federal Railroad Administration horn quiet zone. , McHenry is the 198th busiest of the 236 non-downtown stations in the Metra system, with an average of 85 weekday boardings.

As of April 25, 2022, McHenry is served by six trains (three in each direction) on weekdays. There is no weekend or holiday service on the McHenry branch.

Station layout

McHenry station consists of one platform and two tracks. One track is used by revenue trains while the other is used as siding for out-of-service trains. The tracks, despite no current use, continue to Barnard Mill Road in the Village of Ringwood, Illinois at the Dow Chemical plant, where the Union Pacific McHenry Subdivision ends. The tracks were pulled up between Richmond, Illinois and Ringwood in 1980 when service was cut back.  However, UP left trackage for local freight trains that served industries in and around McHenry, all of which are long gone. The only freight customer remaining on the McHenry Subdivision is Terra Cotta Industries in Prairie Grove, 4 miles south of McHenry station.

Pace bus connections
As of October 2018:
 806 Crystal Lake/Fox Lake
 807 Woodstock/McHenry via Wonder Lake

References

External links
Metra station page - McHenry
Station from Main Street from Google Maps Street View
Metra Union Pacific Northwest Line; McHenry Branch (ChicagoRailfan.net)

Metra stations in Illinois
Former Chicago and North Western Railway stations
Railway stations in the United States opened in 1910
McHenry, Illinois
Railway stations in McHenry County, Illinois